Caroline Allen (born June 18, 1992 in Attleboro, Massachusetts), is an American women's international motorcycle trials rider.

Biography
Allen first competed in the NATC Women's Trials Championship in 2005, scoring a third-place finish in the final New York round, enough to give her 10th place in the championship. She returned in 2006 and entered three rounds, taking her first national victory in Rhode Island and ending the season with a good 4th place.

After skipping national events in 2007, Allen returned to compete in her first full season in 2008, taking podium finishes in all six rounds and finishing the season in 3rd place behind Canadian Christy Williams and Sarah Duke. Allen was selected to represent the US in the annual FIM Trial des Nations event held in Andorra alongside Duke and Louise Forsley. The US women's team finished in 7th position.

In the NATC Championship for 2009 she was once again 3rd behind Williams and Duke. This year the TDN was held in Italy and the US team of Allen and Duke finished in 8th place.

One step closer to the top in 2010 after a pair of wins in Rhode Island and another pair in New York moved Allen up the standings to 2nd place behind Williams. Another trip to the TDN series was on the card as Allen and Duke journeyed to Poland and came home with 8th place.

A strong finish in the nationals for 2011. Allen won the final four rounds and claimed her first NATC National title ahead of TDN teammate Sarah Duke. The pair were then joined by Louise Forsley for a trip to Italy for a 7th-place finish in the 2011 TDN event.

In 2012 Allen was beaten in the NATC title chase by New Mexico rider Rachel Hassler, ending the season in 2nd place. Hassler also joined Allen and Forsley in the US TDN team who finished 5th in Switzerland, only 5 points behind the German team.
 
The following year Allen regained her US Women's title, taking the win ahead of Hassler in the newly added NATC Women's Expert Sportsman class.

In 2015 the NATC support classes were split into separate East and West series. Allen finished in 2nd place in the Eastern series behind Madeleine Hoover.

Competing in only the Florida National rounds in 2016, Allen finished 5th in the NATC East Women's Expert Sportsman class.

National Trials Championship Career

Honors
 US National NATC Women's Trials Champion 2011
 US National NATC Women's ES Trials Champion 2013

See also
 NATC Trials Championship
 FIM Trial European Championship
 FIM Trial World Championship
 Trial des Nations

References 

1992 births
Living people
American motorcycle racers
Motorcycle trials riders